Telč is a town in the Jihlava District in the Vysočina Region of the Czech Republic. It has about 5,100 inhabitants. The town is well known for its historic centre, which is protected by law as an urban monument reservation and is a UNESCO World Heritage Site.

Administrative parts
Telč is made up of town parts of Telč-Podolí, Telč-Staré Město, Telč-Štěpnice and Telč-Vnitřní Město, and of village of Studnice. Studnice forms an exclave of the municipal territory.

Etymology
The settlement was originally named Teleč. The name was created by adding the possessive suffix to the personal name Telec (meaning "young calf") and was masculine. The current name Telč is feminine.

Geography

It lies in the Křižanov Highlands.

The Telčský Stream flows through the town and contributes the Moravian Thaya River in the south. The Moravian Thaya partly forms the eastern border of the municipal territory. The territory is rich in ponds. The set of ponds Štěpnický, Ulický and Staroměstský is located in the centre of the town.

History
According to local legend, the town was founded in 1099, however the first written mention is from 1335. The Gothic castle, Gothic houses and water fortification were built in the mid-14th century. The development ended during the Hussite Wars. The town was conquered by the Hussites but the castle resisted.

Telč slowly recovered and another period of prosperity occurred during the rule of Zachariáš of Hradec. In the middle of the 16th century, he had the medieval castle rebuilt in the Renaissance style. He also had the Gothic houses rebuilt into Renaissance houses with arcades and decorated façades. During the Thirty Years' War, the town was shortly occupied by Swedish army. The counter-reformation brought the Jesuits to the town, who built the Church of the Name of Jesus in 1667, and founded the Jesuit Latin Grammar School.

During the 18th century, the town profited from wealthy townspeople who had statues, fountains, chapels and Marian column built. In 1773, the rights of the Jesuit Order were cancelled. From 1785, Telč was germanised. During the 19th century, the industry developed. The railway was built in 1898.

Demographics

Sights

The historic town centre is located between the Štěpnický and Ulický ponds and also delimited by town walls. The historic centre is protected as an urban monument reservation and the town part of Telč-Staré Město is an urban monument zone. Since 1992, Telč has been a UNESCO World Heritage Site.

The town square is a unique complex of long urban plaza with well-conserved Renaissance and Baroque houses with high gables and arcades. The houses have been uniformly reconstructed in the Renaissance styles and later gables and façades of some of them were individually remodelled. in most cases in the Baroque style.

The 17th-century Renaissance château with an English-style park is one of the main landmarks of the square and whole town. One of the most valuable parts is the Chapel of All Saints with stucco decoration. There are several exhibition routes and the château also houses a branch of the Vysočina Museum with ethnographic, historical and archaeological collections.

In popular culture
In 1963 Vojtěch Jasný made the film The Cassandra Cat in Telč. In 1979 Werner Herzog filmed the movie Woyzeck in Telč.

Multiple Czech fairy tale movies were filmed in the Telč Castle, most known are The Proud Princess (1952) or Z pekla štěstí (1999).

Notable people
Siegfried Taub (1876–1946), Jewish politician
Leopold Lojka (1886–1926), Archduke Franz Ferdinand's chauffeur
Theodor Schaefer (1904–1969), composer and pedagogue

Twin towns – sister cities

Telč is twinned with:
 Belp, Switzerland
 Figeac, France
 Rothenburg ob der Tauber, Germany
 Šaľa, Slovakia
 Waidhofen an der Thaya, Austria
 Wilber, United States

Gallery

References

External links

 
Telč on DiscoverCzech Travel Agency

 
Cities and towns in the Czech Republic
Castles in the Czech Republic
Populated places in Jihlava District
World Heritage Sites in the Czech Republic